Pinkalicious is a series of children's picture books written and illustrated by Victoria Kann. The first two books, Pinkalicious and Purplicious, were co-written with her sister, Elizabeth Kann. The books are aimed at ages 4-8, and are based on Victoria's two daughters and their love for the color pink.

Premise 
The stories center on Pinkalicious Pinkerton, an imaginative young girl who loves the color pink, and are told in first-person narrative. They are also about her younger brother, Peter, who likes riding his scooter and playing with blocks.

Books

Reception
Shanea Goldizen of Library Point describes Pinkalicious as "a colorful, scrumptious feast for the eyes and will keep your kids reading and re-reading." A Publishers Weekly review said that 'the artwork creates visual interest to keep pink-loving gals involved in this tale of wonderful-to-wretched excess.'

Adaptations

Musical
In 2007, Pinkalicious was adapted into a 50-minute musical, named Pinkalicious the Musical. In it, Pinkalicious cannot stop eating pink cupcakes despite her parents warning her. After eating too many, she is diagnosed by a doctor with "Pinkititis", an illness that turns her completely pink. She doesn't seem to mind, because it is her favorite color. But when it goes too far, she must figure out a way to stop it.

TV series
Pinkalicious & Peterrific is a children's television series that follows the adventures of Pinkalicious and her brother Peter. The series premiered on PBS Kids on February 19, 2018, and is co-produced by WGBH Kids and Sixteen South.

References

External links

Official website
Pinkalicious the Musical website
Pinkalicious & Peterrific website

Book series introduced in 2006
Children's fiction books
Fiction about unicorns
Series of children's books
2006 children's books
American picture books